This article is a list of episodes of documentary television series Unsolved History.

Episodes

Season 1
 Gettysburg: Pickett's Charge
 The Death of the U.S.S. Maine
 Inside Hitler's Bunker
 Forensics in the White House
 Custer's Last Stand
 The Alamo
 The Iceman Mystery
 Pearl Harbor: Death of the Arizona
 The Death of the Red Baron (produced by Termite Art Productions)  – concluded that the legendary German air ace Rittmeister Manfred von Richthofen was killed by Gunner W. J. "Snowy" Evans of the 53rd Australian Field Artillery Battery. However, some other sources suggest that the fatal shot was fired by Sgt Cedric Popkin of the 24th Australian Machine Gun Company.<ref name="channel4">Dogfight - The Mystery of the Red Baron, Channel 4, Secret History, 22 December 2003. US broadcast as "Who Killed the Red Baron? Explore Competing Theories." Pbs.org, (Public Broadcasting Service) Nova, 7 October 2003.</ref>
 Shoot-Out at the O.K. Corral The Boston Massacre JFK: Death in Dealey Plaza (produced by Termite Art Productions)
 The Roman Colosseum Wilhelm Gustloff: World's Deadliest Sea Disaster Who Killed Julius Caesar? The Assassination of King Tut Escapes from Alcatraz JFK: Altered Statesman Death of Princess Diana San Francisco's Earthquake of 1906Season 2
 Death of Marilyn Monroe Roswell: Flying Saucers Over America Salem Witch Trials JFK: The Conspiracy Myths The Saint Valentine's Day Massacre Aztec Temple of Blood Myths of Pearl Harbor The Plots to Kill Lincoln Nostradamus The Great Chicago Fire Jack the Ripper Killing Hitler – Re-created various scenarios of the July 20 plot
 Robert F. Kennedy Assassination Hunting Nazis – After World War II almost 30,000 war criminals escaped from Europe. Was Mengele part of a Fourth Reich dedicated to evil plots to restore Nazi power? The truth is that Mengele, like many ex-Nazis, led a pathetic hunted animal existence after the war. Features archeologist Clyde Snow.
 The Trojan Horse Suicide Bombers Ninjas Flight KAL-007 History Of The Ninja In Search Of D. B. Cooper Butch and Sundance – The controversy surrounding Butch Cassidy and the Sundance Kid has raged since the famous shootout in Bolivia in 1908. Travel to San Vicente, Bolivia, to investigate the rumors that these outlaws survived the ambush and returned to the United States.
 The Bermuda TriangleSeason 3
 American P.I.: The Case of O.J. Simpson JFK: Beyond the Magic Bullet American P.I.: The Son of Sam Case - In 1977, the NYPD arrested David Berkowitz for a string of shootings that terrorized New York City. Examine the Son of Sam murders to find out whether Berkowitz acted alone or as part of a satanic cult.
 The Hope Diamond Area 51 - Northwest of Las Vegas lies a mysterious place known as Area 51. Although the U.S. government denies its existence, Area 51 has become part of pop culture, inspiring films, books and TV. Explore the cloak of secrecy that surrounds this military base. Researchers: Nick Cook, James Goodall, Stan Gordon, Daniel Martinez.
 Unstoppable Wave - The 2004 Indian Ocean earthquake and tsunami
 The Lost Colony JFK: Inside the Target Car JFK: The Ruby Connection The Donner Party''

References

External links
 Discovery Times: Unsolved History Schedule
 TV.com - Unsolved History

Lists of American non-fiction television series episodes
Lists of documentary television series episodes